Daniel W. Marmon (10 October 1844 – 1909) was an industrialist from Richmond, Indiana, United States.

Born in Logan County, Ohio, Marmon was orphaned at age 5 (see Maxinkuckee History) and raised by his industrialist uncle, Eli Stubbs. As a boy, Marmon spent a great deal of time visiting the E. & A. H. Nordyke plant, a maker of milling equipment.

In 1865, after his graduation from Earlham College, Daniel become an equal partner in the mill construction business, and the company was renamed Nordyke Marmon & Company. It became most notable for its automobiles.

In 1882 Daniel and his wife Elizabeth purchased their property at 1100 East Shore Drive on Lake Maxinkuckee's East Shore. It contained a small cottage and over time, the cottage was expanded and outbuildings constructed.

Daniel Marmon died in 1909.

Sources 

Defunct companies based in Indiana
People from Richmond, Indiana
Earlham College alumni
1844 births
1909 deaths
19th-century American businesspeople